Elections are held every two years to elect the mayor of Worcester, Massachusetts.

Worcester, Massachusetts held its first direct election for mayor in 1987.

Worcester has a council–manager government in which the mayor's role is to chair both the Worcester City Council and the city's school committee.

Election system
Popular elections for mayor were instituted after the city's voters approved a new city charter in 1985.

In order to be elected mayor in Worcester, a person must place first in the mayor's race and also finish among the top six in the at-large city council election, being also elected a councilor at large. An individual cannot be elected mayor without additionally winning an at-large city council seat.

In addition, the candidate elected to the office of councilor at large who receives the
second-highest number of votes for the office of mayor will become vice-chair of the Worcester City Council.

1987 mayoral election

The 1987 Worcester, Massachusetts mayoral election was held on November 3, 1987. The first ever popular election for mayor in the city's history, it saw the election of Jordan Levy to a second nonconsecutive term as mayor.

Candidates
John B. Anderson, at-large City Council member since 1976 and former mayor (1986)
Gustaf Coontz
Joseph Diliberto
Jordan Levy, City Council member since 1975 and former mayor (1980–1981)

Results

In the at-large City Council election, Levy placed first, Anderson placed fourth, Coontz placed tenth, and Donovan placed thirteenth.

1989 mayoral election

The 1989 Worcester, Massachusetts mayoral election was held on November 7, 1989. It saw the reelection of Jordan Levy to a third overall, and second-consecutive term (his second term as a popularly elected mayor).

Candidates
Joseph Diliberto, mayoral candidate in 1987
Margaret Donovan
Jordan Levy, incumbent mayor
Lynne Simonds

Results

In the at-large City Council general election, Levy placed first, Simonds placed ninth, Diliberto placed eleventh, and Donovan placed twelfth.

1991 mayoral election

The 1991 Worcester, Massachusetts mayoral election was held on November 5, 1991. It saw the reelection of Jordan Levy to a fourth overall, and third-consecutive term (his third term as a popularly elected mayor).

Candidates
William S. Coleman, III
Timothy J. Cooney, Jr., city councilor since 1980 and former mayor of Worcester (1987)
Jordan Levy, incumbent mayor
Konstantina Lukes, at-large City Council member since 1990

Results

In the at-large City Council general election, Levy placed first, Cooney placed third, Lukes placed sixth, and Coleman placed eighth.

1993 mayoral election

The 1993 Worcester, Massachusetts mayoral election was held on November 2, 1993. It saw the election of Raymond Mariano.

Incumbent mayor Jordan Levy did not seek reelection.

Campaign
There were enough candidates in the at-large city council in 1995 that a primary was mandated for it, which was held in mid-September. Due to the laws requiring that a mayor also be elected an at-large city councilor, anyone who wanted to compete in the mayoral race would need to be on the ballot in the at-large City Council primary and advance to the at-large City Council general election if they hoped to be elected mayor.

Ultimately the mayoral candidates on the ballot were John B. Anderson, Austin A. Heath, Konstantina Lukes, and Raymond Mariano. All four had been among those that advanced to the at-large City Council general election from the primary, with Anderson placing first, Mariano placing second, Lukes placing fourth, and Heath placing tenth.

Candidate John B. Anderson, who served many years as a city councilor, had previously served as a City Council-appointed mayor in 1986.

Candidates
John B. Anderson, at-large city council member since 1976 and former mayor (1986)
Austin A. Heath
Konstantina Lukes, at-large city council member since 1990
Raymond Mariano, city council member since 1982

Results

In the at-large City Council general election, Mariano placed first, Anderson placed second, Lukes placed third, and Heath placed ninth.

1995 mayoral election

The 1995 Worcester, Massachusetts mayoral election was held on November 7, 1995. It saw the reelection of Raymond Mariano.

Campaign
There were enough candidates in the at-large city council in 1995 that a primary was mandated for it, which was held in mid-September. Due to the laws requiring that a mayor also be elected an at-large city councilor, anyone who wanted to compete in the mayoral race would need to be on the ballot in the at-large City Council primary and advance to the at-large City Council general election if they hoped to be elected mayor.

Ultimately the mayoral candidates on the ballot were incumbent mayor Raymond Mariano and challengers William Coleman and Robert J. Hennigan. All three had been among those that advanced to the at-large City Council general election from the primary, with Mariano placing first in the at-large city council primary, Hennigan placing fourth, and Coleman placing twelfth.

Candidates
William "Bill" Coleman III, mayoral candidate in 1991
Robert J. Hennigan Jr.
Raymond Mariano, incumbent mayor since 1993

Results

In the at-large City Council election, Mariano placed first and Hennigan placed ninth, and Coleman placed eleventh.

1997 mayoral election

The 1997 Worcester, Massachusetts mayoral election was held on November 4, 1997. It saw the reelection of Raymond Mariano to a third consecutive term.

Candidates
Bill Coleman, community activist, candidate for mayor in 1991, 1995
Raymond Mariano, incumbent mayor since 1993

Results

In the at-large City Council election, Mariano placed first and Coleman placed tenth.

1999 mayoral election

The 1999 Worcester, Massachusetts mayoral election was held on November 3, 1999. It saw the reelection of Raymond Mariano to a fourth consecutive term.

Candidates
George A. Fox
Konstantina Lukes, Worcester City Council at-large member since 1990 and mayoral candidate in 1993
Raymond Mariano, incumbent mayor since 1993

Results

In the at-large City Council election, Mariano placed first, Lukes placed third, and Fox placed eleventh.

2001 mayoral election

The 2001 Worcester, Massachusetts mayoral election was held on November 6, 2001. It saw the election of Tim Murray.

Incumbent mayor Raymond Mariano did not seek reelection.

Candidates
William Coleman, III, community activist, candidate for mayor in 1991 and 1995
Tim Murray, member of Worcester City Council since 1998

Results

Murray also finished first in the at-large city council election. Coleman finished eighth. Since Coleman, the second place finisher, failed to be elected an at-large city council, he was not elected vice-chair of the Worcester City Council.

2003 mayoral election

The 2003 Worcester, Massachusetts mayoral election was held on November 4, 2003. It saw the reelection of incumbent mayor Tim Murray to a second term.

Candidates
William Coleman, III, community activist candidate for mayor in 1991, 1995, 1997, and 2001
Juan Gomez, Worcester City Council at-large member since 2000
Tim Murray, incumbent mayor

Results

Murray also finished first in the at-large city council election. Coleman finished second, Gomez finished fifth, Coleman finished seventh. Gomez, by rules of the city charter, became the vice-chair of the Worcester City Council.

2005 mayoral election

The 2005 Worcester, Massachusetts mayoral election was held on November 8, 2005. It saw the reelection of incumbent mayor Tim Murray to a third term.

Campaign
Incumbent mayor Tim Murray most significant challenger was City Council member Konstantina Lukes, who had been a frequent critic of Murray.

While running for mayoral reelection, Murray had already begun his campaign for the 2006 Massachusetts lieutenant gubernatorial nomination.

Candidates
William Coleman, III, community activist candidate for mayor in 1991, 1995, 2001 and 2003
Juan Gomez, Worcester City Council at-large member since 2000, candidate for mayor in 2003
Konstantina Lukes, Worcester City Council at-large member since 1990, mayoral candidate in 1993 and 1999
William McCarthy, college professor, former Connecticut state trooper, executive assistant in the Louisiana Office of Alcohol and Tobacco Control from 1996 to 1999
Tim Murray, incumbent mayor

Results

Murray also finished first in the at-large city council election. Lukes finished second, Gomez finished eighth, Coleman finished ninth, and McCarthy finished tenth. Lukes, by the rules of the city charter, became the vice-chair of the Worcester City Council.

2007 mayoral election

The 2007 Worcester, Massachusetts mayoral election was held on November 6, 2007. It saw the reelection of incumbent mayor Konstantina B. Lukes, who had been appointed to the position earlier that year after Tim Murray resigned to become Lieutenant Governor of Massachusetts.

Lukes became the city's first elected female mayor as a result of this election.

Candidates
William Coleman, III, community activist candidate for mayor in 1991, 1995, 2001, 2003, and 2005
Konstantina Lukes, incumbent mayor, Worcester City Council at-large member since 1990, mayoral candidate in 1993, 1999 and 2005
Gary Rosen, Worcester City Council at-large member since 2006 and 1996–97, former five-term Worcester School Committee member
Frederick C. Rushton, Worcester City Council member and attorney

Withdrawn candidates
Dennis L. Irish, Worcester City Council at-large member
Mike C. Perotto, Worcester City Council at-large member

Campaign
Lukes saw two strong challengers, Rushton and Rosen.

Rather than issues, the election largely focused on the personality and the leadership style of Lukes.

Lukes and Rushton were the best-funded candidates. Lukes managed to raise $31,381 for her campaign. Rushton managed to raise $80,000 for his campaign.

Despite the fact that Lukes identified as a Democrat, the city's Democratic Party leaders sought to unseat her. They hoped to coalesce opposition to Lukes behind a single candidate, and ultimately Rushton became their candidate. Rushton would ultimately receive most of the endorsements from major Democratic politicians in the region. Rushton's brother-in-law, Worcester County's new District Attorney Joseph D. Early, appeared at campaign events for him, marking the first time in decades that a District Attorney had involved himself in a political campaign.

There was an unusually large field of candidates running to be at-large city councilors in 2007. This field large enough that a primary was mandated for the at-large city council election, which was held in mid-September. Due to the laws requiring that a mayor also be elected an at-large city councilor, anyone who wanted to compete in the mayoral race (whether they had announced yet or not) would need to be on the ballot in the at-large City Council primary and advance to the at-large City Council general election if they hoped to be elected mayor. While it was not at all required that mayoral candidates declare their candidacies before the at-large City Council primary, four candidates already had declared their candidates. After the at-large City Council primary, in which Lukes placed second among all candidates, and Rushton placed third, two of the candidates, dropped-out of the mayoral race. These were Dennis L. Irish and Mike C. Perotto, who had respectively placed fifth and eighth out of all candidates in the at-large City Council primary. This bolstered the Democratic Party's hopes of coalescing opposition to Lukes around a single candidate, which had emerged to be Rushton.

Rosen declared his candidacy after the at-large City Council primary, in which he had placed first. Rosen's entrance into the race posed an obstacle to the Democratic Party leadership's hopes of coalescing opposition to Lukes behind a single candidate.

As of early October, Lukes and Rushton were the only two candidates with campaign websites.

Finances

Results
The initial result, seeing Lukes lead by only 105 votes, was narrow enough that a hand-recount was conducted after Rushton requested one. In the end, only 116 votes separated Lukes and Rushton, with Lukes having seen her lead increase by eleven votes in the recount. , this was the narrowest margin of victory in a Worcester mayoral election since the city started popularly electing its mayors in 1987.

Lukes finished second in the at-large city council election. Rosen finished first, Rushton finished fourth, and Coleman finished twelfth. Rosen, by the rules of the city charter, became the vice-chair of the Worcester City Council.

2009 mayoral election

The 2009 Worcester, Massachusetts mayoral election was held on November 3, 2009. It saw the election of Joseph C. O'Brien, who unseated incumbent mayor Konstantina B. Lukes.

, this is the only time an incumbent mayor has lost reelection in a Worcester mayoral election since they started popularly electing mayors in 1987. , it is the only instance in which an incumbent Worcester mayor has lost such an election.

O'Brien was the first mayor to be elected without having first served on the Worcester City Council.

Candidates
Konstantina Lukes, incumbent mayor since 2007, Worcester City Council at-large member since 1990
Joseph C. O'Brien, former School Committee member (2002–2008)
Kate Toomey, Worcester City Council at-large member since 2006
Emanuel Tsitsilianos

Campaign
While there was speculation that Frederick C. Rushton, who had lost the 2007 to Lukes by an immensely narrow margin, might challenge her again in 2009, he ruled it out in February 2009.

The election race was slow to start.

Lukes, as she did in the previous election, saw two strong challengers, the two this time being O'Brien and Toomey.

O'Brien's candidacy was supported by lieutenant governor and former Worcester mayor Tim Murray. O'Brien was also supported by congressman Jim McGovern, for whom he served as district director (O'Brien took a leave from this role during his mayoral campaign). Many other local Democrats threw their support behind O'Brien. O'Brien also received the support of several employee unions.

Toomey was endorsed by the Worcester County Sheriff and one of the city's two state senators.

The election focused more on the leadership and personality of Lukes than it did on particular issues.

O'Brien and Toomey criticized Lukes for being to inactive a mayor, and argued that she was ineffective at advocating for the city at the state and federal level. Lukes refuted accusations that she was too inactive, arguing that the role of mayor was not intended to be a full-time position.

Lukes argued that she had independence from what she claimed was a Murray-McGovern run political machine.

Lukes argued that O'Brien was simply seeking to use the office of mayor as a platform to seek higher office, and argued that she herself was free from such ambitions.

O'Brien pledged to commit attention to inner-city neighborhoods, and called attention to the fact that he resided in the less-affluent Main South area of the city.

O'Brien aimed to run a movement-style campaign, seeking small online donations and utilizing the internet to organize campaign events.

Lukes raised $33,895 for her campaign. Lukes collected mainly small donations, and solicited her donations primarily by mail. Financially, Lukes ran a low-cost campaign, even using her private law-office to house her campaign headquarters.

O'Brien raised $43,300 for his campaign. O'Brien was additionally supported by the grassroots group Neighbor to Neighbor, which funded $6,000 in mailers for his campaign.

Toomey raised $33,633  for her campaign.

Tsitsilianos did not raise any money for his campaign, and received little attention. However, he did participate in the mayoral debates.

In an interview shortly after losing the election, Lukes would blame the "pro-retire, pro-union" vote for her loss. She would also claim to have been hurt by low turnout, which she claimed O'Brien was able to capitalize on with his campaign's organization efforts. She would also characterize the campaign against her as "very negative...right up until the end".

Results

O'Brien also finished first in the at-large city council election. Toomey finished second, Lukes finished fifth, Tsitsilianos finished eleventh. Lukes, by the rules of the city charter, became the vice-chair of the Worcester City Council.

O'Brien was the only non-incumbent individual elected to a citywide office in Worcester that year.

2011 mayoral election

The 2011 Worcester, Massachusetts mayoral election was held on November 8, 2011. It saw the election of Joseph Petty.

On September 16, 2011, incumbent mayor Joseph C. O'Brien announced that he would no longer be seeking reelection, citing family concerns.

Candidates
Bill Coleman, candidate for mayor in 1991, 1995, 2001, 2003, and 2005, and 2007
Carmen L. Carmona, case worker at Community Healthlink Inc.
Konstantina Lukes, former mayor (2007–2010), Worcester City Council at-large member since 1990
Joseph Petty, member of Worcester City Council since 1998

Results

Petty also finished first in the at-large city council election. Lukes finished fourth, Carmona finished eleventh, and Coleman finished twelfth. Lukes, by the rules of the city charter, became the vice-chair of the Worcester City Council.

2013 mayoral election

The 2013 Worcester, Massachusetts mayoral election was held on November 5, 2013. It saw the reelection of incumbent mayor Joseph Petty to a second term.

Candidates
Bill Coleman, candidate for mayor in 1991, 1995, 1997, 2001, 2003, 2005, 2007, and 2011
William Feegbeh
Konstantina Lukes, former mayor (2007–2010), Worcester City Council at-large member since 1990
Joseph Petty, incumbent mayor, Worcester City Council member since 1998

Results

Petty also finished first in the at-large city council election. Lukes finished fourth, Coleman finished eighth, and Feegbeh finished twelfth. Lukes, by the rules of the city charter, became the vice-chair of the Worcester City Council.

2015 mayoral election

The 2015 Worcester, Massachusetts mayoral election was held on November 3, 2015. It saw the reelection of incumbent mayor Joseph Petty to a third term.

Candidates
Michael T. Gaffney
William S. Coleman, III, candidate for mayor in 1991, 1995, 1997, 2001, 2003, 2005, 2007, 2011, and 2013
Joseph Petty, incumbent mayor, Worcester City Council member since 1998

Results

Petty also finished first in the at-large city council election. Gaffney finished second and Coleman finished eleventh. Gaffney, by the rules of the city charter, became the vice-chair of the Worcester City Council.

2017 mayoral election

The 2017 Worcester, Massachusetts mayoral election was held on November 7, 2017. It saw the reelection of incumbent mayor Joseph Petty to a fourth term.

Candidates
Konstantina Lukes, former mayor (from 2007 to 2010), Worcester City Council at-large member since 1990
Joseph Petty, incumbent mayor, Worcester City Council member since 1998

Results

Petty also finished first in the at-large city council election. Lukes finished sixth. Lukes, by the rules of the city charter, became the vice-chair of the Worcester City Council.

2019 mayoral election

The 2019 Worcester, Massachusetts mayoral election was held on November 5, 2019. It saw the reelection of incumbent mayor Joseph Petty. Petty became the first-ever mayor in the history of Worcester to receive a fifth two-year term as mayor.

Candidates
Bill Coleman, community activist, candidate for mayor in 1991, 1995, 2001, 2003, 2005, 2007, 2011, 2013, and 2015
Donna M. Colorio, member of the Worcester School Committee and former chair of the Worcester Republican City Committee
Joseph Petty, incumbent mayor, Worcester City Council member since 1998
Owurakwaku Poku Sarkodieh

Campaign
The election was a four person race.

Petty's prime challenger was Colorio, the former chair of the Worcester Republican City Committee and two-term member of the Worcester School Committee. Colorio was supported by the Republican Super PAC Massachusetts Majority Independent Expenditure PAC (MMIE PAC).

Results

Petty also finished first in the at-large city council election. Toomey placed second, Colorio paced sixth, Coleman placed ninth, and Sarkodieh placed tenth. Colorio, by the rules of the city charter, became the vice-chair of the Worcester City Council.

2021 mayoral election

The 2021 Worcester, Massachusetts mayoral election was held on November 2, 2021. It saw the reelection of incumbent mayor Joseph Petty to a record sixth term.

Candidates
Bill Coleman, community activist and perennial candidate (candidate for mayor in 1991, 1995, 2001, 2003, 2005, 2007, 2011, 2013, 2015, and 2019)
Donna Colorio, vice chair of the Worcester City Council and mayoral candidate in 2019
Joseph Petty, incumbent mayor and Worcester City Council member since 1998
Peter Stefan, funeral director

Results

Petty also finished first in the at-large city council election. Colorio paced sixth, Coleman placed eighth, and Stefan placed tenth. Colorio, by the rules of the city charter, became the vice-chair of the Worcester City Council.

2023 mayoral election

The 2023 Worcester, Massachusetts mayoral election will be held in November 2023. Incumbent mayor Joseph Petty is running for re-election to a seventh term in office.

Candidates

Declared
Joseph Petty, incumbent mayor

Potential
Moe Bergman, city councilor
Maureen Binienda, former Superintendent of Worcester Public Schools
Donna Colorio, vice chair of the Worcester City Council and candidate for mayor in 2019 and 2021
Khrystian King, city councilor

References